Des Mein Niklla Hoga Chand is an Indian television series that aired on Star Plus. The show was initially directed and produced by Aruna Irani under AK Films and since late 2004 by Sunjoy Waddhwa's Sphere Origins until its end. It originally aired from 29 October 2001 to 28 March 2005 every Monday at the prime time.

Plot 
The story is about the family of Pritam Singh, an NRI who settled in the United Kingdom. The show is largely centered on Pritam's granddaughter, Parminder (Sangeeta Ghosh), who holds traditional Indian values. The story takes off when Parminder meets Dev (Varun Badola) at her cousin's wedding in Chandigarh. They fall in love, but Pammi is already engaged to Dr. Rohan in London. They eventually get married, but alas happiness is not written in their destiny as Dev's ex-fiancé Anu marries Pammi's brother and has made it her task in taking revenge on Pammi by ending her and Dev's marriage.

This is a story of love, revenge and hate as the twists and turns in this story determine the fate of the lives of Pammi and Dev.

Cast 
 
 Sangeeta Ghosh as Parminder (Pammi) Singh Kent / Parminder Dev Malik / Parminder Rohan Malhotra / Mahi Malik (Gungun) (Dev & Pammi's Daughter) / Mahi Mathur (Sharad's Adopted Daughter) / Mahi Rajveer Kapoor
 Varun Badola as Dev Malik / Rohit Sharma (Plastic Surgery) / Bhola
 Amar Upadhyay as Rohit Sharma / Dev Malik (Raj) (Plastic Surgery)
 Siddharth Dhawan as Dr. Rohan Malhotra (Pammi's Ex-Husband)
 Arun Bali as Pritam Singh Kent (Pammi's Grandfather) 
 Vineeta Malik as Sukhwant Pritam Singh Kent (Pammi's Grandmother)
 Yatin Karyekar as Rajinder Singh Kent (Pammi's Father)
 Aruna Irani as Teji Rajinder Singh Kent (Pammi's Mother)
 Swapnil Joshi as Samarjeet (Sam) Singh Kent (Pammi's Younger Brother)
 Sweta Keswani as Anu Khurana / Anu Samarjeet Singh Kent
 Romanchak Arora as Akash Mehra (Dingy's Husband)
 Himanshi Choudhry as Dingy Singh Kent / Dingy Akash Mehra (Pammi's Sister)
 Hansika Motwani as Child Tina Singh Kent
 Urvashi Dholakia as Preet (Pammi's Friend)
 Mohan Azad as Vikramjeet
 Ranjeev Verma as Satish
 Kulbir Baderson as Kuljeet (Satish's Wife)
 Satyen Kappu as Jaswant Singh
 Rajesh Kumar as Narendra Singh (Jaswant's Son)
 Falguni Parekh as Madhu Rajinder Singh Kent / Reena Thapar
 Kishwer Merchant as Sonam (Samarjeet's Friend)
 Ashlesha Sawant as Anjali Rohit Sharma
 Sai Ballal as Inspector Verma
 Anant Jog as Sharath Patil / Shankar Patil
 Adi Irani as John
 Paritosh Sand as Advocate Sharad Mathur
 Aashish Kaul as DIG Arjun Deshmukh / ACP Arjun Deshmukh
 Rocky Verma as Hospital Incharge
 Karishma Tanna as Tina Singh Kent (Rajinder & Madhu's Daughter, Pammi's Stepsister)
 Neha Mehta as Heer Yash Diwan (Fake Gungun)
 Rohit Roy as Yash Diwan / Karan Thakur
 Rajiv Kumar as Kukku
 Sheela Sharma as Sanjyoth (Kukku's Wife)
 Sushmita Daan as Richa Sharma (Rohit & Anjali's Daughter) / Richa Yash Diwan
 Ankur Nayyar as Rajveer Kapoor
 Tasneem Sheikh as Priya Mathur (Sharad's Daughter)
 Vishal Watwani as Abhay
 Neena Gupta as Mrs. Diwan
 Amit Singh Thakur as Mr. Diwan / Mr. Malhotra (Yash & Rajveer's Father)

Awards

Indian Telly Awards - winners 
In 2002
 Best Costumes for a TV show - Ritu Deora
In 2003
 Best Programme of the Year
 Weekly Serial of the Year Shared with Sanjivani
 Best Title Singer for a TV Show - Sukhwinder Singh
 Best Director of the Year - Aruna Irani
 Best Child Artist of the Year - Hansika Motwani
In 2004 
 Best Weekly Serial

Production
Based on the backdrop of Punjab, the series was produced and directed by Aruna Irani. It was shot extensively in United Kingdom and India. Some initial scenes were shot at Chandigarh.

When Varun Badola quit, Amar Upadhyay was cast for his role of Dev in May 2003.

In October 2003, the series had a crossover with Kasautii Zindagii Kay when both completed two years on the same day with the characters Bubbles Singh from the series and Tapur from Kasautii getting married.

Initially produced by Aruna Irani under AK Films, during October 2004, StarPlus transferred the production of the series to Sphere Origins owing Irani's poor health conditions then. Planned to axe the series in December 2004 owing low ratings, StarPlus then gave the series time until April 2005 and cut the one hour timing of the series to half an hour for the ratings to improve. However, as it did not improve, it ended on 28 March 2005.

Reception

Critics and impact
In 2004 Outlook India quoted, "The soap has carried forward over the years in a compelling, realistic manner."

The series was criticized by the Shiromani Gurdwara Parbandhak Committee for portrayal of Sikhs and for non-baptized actors playing roles of baptized Sikhs.

Ratings

It became one of the top rated Hindi GEC soon after its premiere ranging between 9 and 13 TVR.

In the week December 29, 2002, to January 4, 2003, the series entered the top 10 watched television series after many months, which was earlier occupying positions 11 and 12, garnering 7.4 TVR and the following week, it occupied ninth position with 8.09 TVR. It had also beaten the top shows Kyunki Saas Bhi Kabhi Bahu Thi, Kahaani Ghar Ghar Ki and Kasautii Zindagii Kay to the top spot during early May 2003 garnering 10.9 TVR. The crossover episode between Des Mein and Kasautii during October 2003 garnered 14+ TVR.

However, during 2004, the ratings of the series started to decline and the series ended in 2005.

References

External links 
Des Mein Niklla Hoga Chand Official Site

StarPlus original programming
2001 Indian television series debuts
2005 Indian television series endings
Television shows set in Punjab, India
Television shows set in London